Melissa Kretschmer (born 1962, Santa Monica, California) is an American contemporary artist known for her hybrid sculpture/painting works. She has exhibited extensively both nationally and internationally. She lives and works in New York City.

Education and work 

Kretschmer received a MFA and BFA from the ArtCenter College of Design in Pasadena, California.

Over the course of 25 years, Kretschmer has maintained a rigorous practice of producing deceptively minimal paintings. Her works have been compared to valentines, reliquaries and hermetically sealed vaults. Kretschmer makes use of a variety of materials and techniques that work to redefine formal preconceptions associated with painting as a medium. Vellum, gesso, gouache, plywood and beeswax are among the materials Kretschmer inventively employs. Joining such materials to one another in the manner of collage, her process is one based in both improvisation and meticulousness. These fragments are often measured to a fraction of an inch, but Kretschmer firmly pushes back against precision in favor of accuracy. All of such deliberate gestures work to play with the experience of looking, and play with the viewer's perception of flatness and dimensionality.

Painting After Postmodernism: Belgium-USA 
In 2016 Kretschmer's work was included in the group exhibition Painting After Postmodernism: Belgium-USA, curated by art historian, filmmaker, and curator Barbara Rose. The exhibition featured sixteen painters—half of them Americans, half Belgians, and was mounted at the historic Vanderborght building and Cinéma Galeries in Brussels. In this extensive survey, accompanied by a catalogue, Rose sought to encourage exchange and assert the need for a new discussion surrounding the condition of contemporary painting. The American painters, including Larry Poons and Ed Moses, were primarily older, more established artists associated with Rose since the late 1960s in New York when a Clement Greenberg's "post-painterly" abstraction was giving way to multiform "pluralism." Kretschmer and artist Martin Kline represented the relatively younger generation of process/image painters embodying the inheritance of this turn. For her work in the show, multiple pieces in a range of sizes, Kretschmer garnered considerable attention with one critic going so far to say that "stole the show." In The New Criterion, Karen Wilkin described the experience of viewing Kretschmer's works in the exhibition:

Exhibitions 
Kretschmer has had solo exhibitions in the United States at: The Boulder Museum of Art, Boulder; Lesley Heller Gallery, New York; Ace Gallery, Beverly Hills; Stark Gallery, New York; Westenburg, Marfa; Trans Hudson, New York; AMO Gallery, Los Angeles; Littlejohn/Sternau, New York; Fulcrum, New York; Julian Pretto, New York; Anne Plumb, New York.

She has also had numerous solo exhibitions internationally that include: Konrad Fischer Galerie, Düsseldorf; Konrad Fischer Galerie, Berlin; Giacomo Guidi, Rome; Drawing Room, Hamburg; Galeria Alfonso Artiaco, Naples; Galerie Meert-Rihoux, Brussels; Galerie Tschudi, Glarus; Galerie Arnaud Lefebvre, Paris; Kunst-Station Sankt Peter, Köln; Geukens & De Vil, Knokke; Galerie Frank, Paris; Galerie Cramer, Bonn; Caledonian Hall, Royal Botanic Garden, Edinburgh

Kretschmer's work has been included in numerous group exhibition MoMA PS1, Long Island City;  the Madison Museum of Contemporary Art, Madison;  and the Miami Art Museum, Miami; the Wadsworth Atheneum, Hartford; Centre Pompidou Paris; Galerie Arnaud Lefebvre, Paris; and Palazzo Bembo, Venice, among others.

Catalogues 
Rose, Barbara. Inside Out – Martin Kline and Melissa Kretschmer, Paul Rodgers / 9W, 2016.
Rose, Barbara and Timothy A. Eaton. Anti Icon, Eaton Fine Art, Inc., 2010.
Swanson, Dean and Martin Friedman. LEWITT X 2, Madison Museum of Contemporary Art, 2006.
Wei, Lilly. Glass, Seriously, Dorsky Gallery, April, 2005.
Due, 1000eventi, Milan, February 2005.
Melissa Kretschmer, Kunst-Station Sankt Peter Köln, 2003.
Melissa Kretschmer/Carl Andre: A Conversation, Galerie Frank, Paris, 1999.
Campbell, James D. Images/After Images: More Than Meets the Eye, Work Space Gallery, 1996.
Harris, Mark. Material Abuse, Trans Hudson Gallery, 1995.

References 

American women painters
American women sculptors
1962 births
Living people
Art Center College of Design alumni
Artists from Santa Monica, California
Artists from New York City
Sculptors from California
Sculptors from New York (state)
21st-century American women artists